Hemiancistrus landoni is a species of catfish in the family Loricariidae. It is native to South America, where it occurs in the Guayas River basin in Ecuador. The species reaches 25 cm (9.8 inches) in total length.

References 

Ancistrini
Fish described in 1916